The Listel Hotel  is a hotel located in the downtown area of the Canadian city of Vancouver, British Columbia

Description and operations
The hotel has 129 rooms. The hotel displays art on loan from the University of British Columbia's Museum of Anthropology, the Buschlen Mowatt Fine Arts Gallery and the Vancouver International Sculpture Biennale and has a collection of international and First Nations art.

The hotel was an inaugural participant in the City of Vancouver's "Corporate Climate Leader" and Tourism Vancouver's "Tourism Ambassador for Conservation" programs. The hotel has 20 solar panels and a heat-capture program, and has been zero-waste-to-landfill since 2011.

Forage, the hotel's restaurant, is an active member of the Green Table Network and the Vancouver Aquarium's Ocean Wise seafood program. The restaurant's small-plate menu is locally sourced.

The Jervis Joint, which serves pub food, is a second restaurant located within the hotel.

Awards 
Expedia listed the hotel in eighth place on its 2019 list of the ten most sustainable hotels.

References

External links
 , the hotel's official website

Year of establishment missing
Hotels in Vancouver